Merrill Rowland Wolfe (October 8, 1914 – January 14, 2010) was an American gymnast and Olympic champion. He competed at the 1932 Summer Olympics in Los Angeles where he received a gold medal in tumbling.

Life 
Wolfe graduated from Woodrow Wilson High School in Dallas, Texas in 1934. He was inducted into the school's Hall of Fame in 1989, the same year the Hall of Fame was created in celebration of the school's 60th Anniversary.

In 1938, Wolfe received a Bachelor of Arts in Biology from Western Reserve University (now Case Western Reserve University). During his time as a student there, he was a member of the Delta Upsilon fraternity, the swimming team, and the gymnastics team - serving as both captain and coach.

Wolfe passed away on January 14th, 2010, in Kerrville, Texas, aged 95.

References

1914 births
2010 deaths
American male artistic gymnasts
Case Western Reserve University alumni
Gymnasts at the 1932 Summer Olympics
Olympic gold medalists for the United States in gymnastics
Medalists at the 1932 Summer Olympics